Coasta Mare may refer to several villages in Romania:

 Coasta Mare, a village in Râciu Commune, Mureș County
 Coasta Mare, a village in Bunești, Vâlcea